Gaz Oakley, known as the Avant-Garde Vegan, is a vegan chef and cookbook author from Cardiff, Wales. He was described in the Daily Telegraph as "a star of the meat-free world", whose "recipes have gained the respect of herbivores and carnivores alike".

Career
Oakley, who grew up in Cardiff, was taught to cook as a child by his father, and got his first job in a kitchen aged 15. He left school at 16 to work in the kitchen full-time. For several years, he worked in hotel and restaurant kitchens in Cardiff. He then switched careers to work in a builder's yard, becoming a sales manager. The new job offered him more free time, and he took up fitness and strength training activities. It was through this that he first started to move towards veganism. After hearing a radio interview with the vegan musician Jme, Oakley looked up videos of Gary Yourofsky, and it was these that encouraged him to switch to a vegan lifestyle. After success encouraging friends and family to transition to veganism, he decided to use his skills and experience in cookery as a form of vegan activism. He launched the @avantgardevegan Instagram page in February 2016, and, later that year, gave up his sales job to focus full-time on activism and cookery. The Avant-Garde Vegan YouTube channel was launched at the end of the year. He went on to write several vegan cookbooks, as well as partner with The Vurger Co. and Wagamama to create vegan foods.

Oakley told The Sunday Times that the COVID-19 pandemic has caused his subscriber numbers to hit one million.

Books
Vegan 100 (Quadrille Publishing, 2018)
Vegan Christmas (Quadrille Publishing, 2018)
Plants Only Kitchen (Quadrille Publishing, 2020)

References

Further reading
Turnbull, Tony (April 25, 2020). "Meet Gaz Oakley, the vegan chef that meat eaters love to follow". The Times. Accessed 8 August 2020. 
"In conversation with Gaz Oakley". The Vurger Co. Accessed 8 August 2020.
"In the kitchen with chef Gaz Oakley of Avant-Garde Vegan". Vegan Food & Living. Accessed 8 August 2020.

External links
Official site
Avant Garde Vegan on YouTube
Avant Garde Vegan on Instagram

Living people
Year of birth missing (living people)
People from Cardiff
Welsh chefs
British cookbook writers
Chefs of vegan cuisine
Vegan cookbook writers